This is an alphabetical list of the Kannada feature films released by the Kannada film Industry 

List of Kannada films of 2018

0–9

 18th Cross
 27 Mavalli Circle
 1st Rank Raju
 No 73, Shanthi Nivasa
 6-5=2
 8MM Bullet
 777 Charlie
 *121#

A

Addhuri
A (1998)
A to Z (1998)
A. K. 47 (1999)
Aaru Mooru Ombhatthu (1970)
Aacya
Aadarshasathi (1955)
Aadithya (1996)
Aaganthuka (1987)
Aaghatha (1995)
Aaha (1999)
Aaha Brahmachari (1993)
Aaha Nanna Maduveyanthe (1999)
Aahuthi (1985)
Aakasmika (1993)
Aakramana (2014)
Aakrosha
Aalemane (1981)
Aanand (1986)
Aananda Bhairavi (1983)
Aananda Bhashpa
Aananda Jyoti
Aananda Kanda
Aananda Sagara
Aapathbandhava (1987)
Apthamitra (2004)
Aptharakshaka (2010)
Aarada Gaaya (1980)
Aaradhane (1984)
Aarambha (1987)
Aarambha (2015)
Aase (1987)
 Aase Abhilashe
Aase Pooraisu (1997)
Aasegobba Meesegobba (1990)
Aaseya Bale (1987)
Aasha
Aasha Jyothi
Aasha Kirana
Aasha Sundari (1960)
Aashadaboothi (1955)
Aasheervada
Aasphota (1988)
Aata Bombata (1990)
Aata Hudugaata (1995)
Aathanka (1993)
Aathma Bandhana (1992)
Aathma Shakthi (1978)
Aavesha (1990)
Abachurina Post Office (1973)
Abale (1988)
Abba aa Hudugi
Abhi (2003)
Abhijith (1993)
Abhimana (1989)
Abhimanyu (1990)
Abhinethri (1999)
Accident (1984)
Accident (2008)
Adalu Badalu (1979)
Adda Dari (1968)
Ade Hrudaya, Ade Mamathe
Ade Kannu (1985)
Ade Raga Ade Hadu (1989)
Adhipati (1994)
Adu (2003)
Adjustment (1992)
Adrushta Rekhe (1989)
Adrushtavantha (1982)
Africadalli Sheela (1986)
Aghora
Agni Divya (1990)
Agni IPS (1997)
Agni Kanye
Agni Panjara (1992)
Agni Pareekshe
Agni Parva
Agni Sakshi
Aidu Beralu
Aishwarya (2006)
Ajagajantara (1991)
Ajay
Ajay Vijay
Ajeya (1985)
Ajith (2014)
Ajnathavasa (1984)
Aakash (2005)
Akhanda Bramhacharigalu
Aleemayya
Alexander
Aliya Alla Magala Ganda
Aliya devaru
Aliya Geleya
Aliya Mane Tholiya
Allah Neene Neene Eshwara
Alle Irodu Nodi
Alli Ramachari Illi Brahmachari
Aluku (1978)
Amar Akbar Anthony
Amara Bharathi
Amara Jyothi
Amara Madhura Prema
Amara Prema
Amarajeevi (1965)
Amarashilpi Jakanachari (1964)
Amarnath (1978)
America America (1995)
Amma (1968)
Ammavara Ganda
Amrutha Bindu
Amrutha Dhare (2005)
Amrutha Sindhu
Amrutha Ghalige (1984)
Amrutha Varshini (1997)
Anamika
Anatharu (2007)
Anantha Prema
Ananthana Avanthara (1989)
Ananthara
Anatha Rakshaka
Andada Aramane
Andaman (1998)
Angaili Apsare
Ani Ani
Anireekshitha
Anjada Gandu (1988)
Anjada Gandu (2014)
Anjani Putra (2017)
Anna Andare Nammanna
Anna Athige
Anna Tamma
Anna Thangi (2005)
Annayya (1993)
Annaji
Annapoorna (1964)
Annavara Makkalu
Antha (1981)
Antharala
Amrutha Vani
Anthargami
Anthima Ghatta
Anthima Theerpu
Anthintha Gandu Nanalla
Anubhava (1984)
Anugraha (1971)
Anukulakkobba Ganda
Anupama
Anuradha
Anuraga Aralithu (1986)
Anuraga Bandhana
Anuraga Devathe
Anuraga Sangama (1995)
Anuraga Spandana-Ananth Nag (not released)
Anuraga Swaradali Apaswara
Anuragada Alegalu (1993)
Anurakthe
Anurupa
Anveshane (1983)
Aparadhi (1976)
Aparadhi Nanalla
Aparajithe
Aparanji
Aparichita (1978)
Aparupada Kathe
Aparupada Athithigalu
Apurva Jodi
Apoorva Sangama (1984)
Apurva Samsara
Appa Nanjappa Maga Gunjapa
Appaji (1996)
Appu (2002)
April Fool (1997)
Aptharakshaka (2010)
Apurva Kanasu
Aragini
Aralida Hoovugalu (1991)
Aranyadalli Abhimanyu (1991)
Arishina Kunkuma
Arasu (2007)
Archana
Ardhangini
Arivu
Arjun Abhimanyu
Arrest Warrant
Aruna Raaga (1986)
Arunodaya (1968)
Aryabhata (1999)
Asadhya Aliya (1979)
Asambhava (1986)
Ashoka
Ashoka Chakra
Ashwamedha (1990)
Atthege Thakka Sose
Athi Madhura Anuraaga
Athiratha Maharatha
Atthegondu Kala, Sosegondu Kala
Atthe Magalu
Atithi
Auto
Auto Raja (1980 film)
Auto Raja (2013 film)
Auto Shankar
Autograph Please
Ava Lucky
Avala Antaranga
Avala Charithre
Avala Hejje
Avala Neralu
Avale Nanna Gelathi
Avale Nanna Hendti
Avale Nanna Hudugi (1999)
Avali Javali
Avane Nanna Ganda
Avane Srimannarayana2018–19
Avasthe
Avathara Purusha
Ayogya (2018 film)
Ayudha
Ayyappa Sharanu
Aa Karaala Ratri
Ammachi Yemba Nenapu
Ambi Ning Vayassaytho
Amma I Love You
Ananthu V/S Nusrath

B

BahaddurBharjari
Ba nalle MadhuchandrakeBa Nanna Preethisu
BaageerathiBabruvaahana (1977)
Baadada HoovuBadavara Bandhu (1976)
Baddi BangarammaBaduku Bangaravayithu
Baduku Jataka bandiBadukuva Dari
Bhagyada BelakuBahaddur Gandu
Bahaddur HennuBaktha Kanakadasa
Baala BandhanaBaala Nagamma
Baala NowkeBaala Panjara
Baalarajana KatheBadmash
Bhale BasavaBhale Bhatta
Baale BhaskarBhale Hombale
Bhale HucchaBhale Huduga
Bhale Jodi (1970 film)
Bhale Keshava
Bhale Kiladi
Bhale Raja
Bhale Rani
Baalida Mane
Baalina Daari
Baalina Guri
Baalina Jyothi
Bal Nanmaga
Baalondu Bhavageete
Baalondu Chaduranga
Baalondu Uyyale
Balu Aparupa Nam Jodi
Baalu Bangara
Baalu Belagithu
Baalu Jenu
Baaluve Ninagagi
Banashankari
Bandha mukta
Bhanda Nanna Ganda
Bandhana
Bandhavya
Bangalore Bandh
Bangalore Bhuta
Bangalore Mail
Bangalore Rathriyalli
Bangarada Baduku
Bangarada Gudi
Bangarada Hoovu
Bangarada Jinke
Bangarada Kalasha
Bangarada Kalla
Bangarada Mane (1981)
Bangarada Mane (1996)
Bangarada Manushya
Bangarada Panjara
Bangaradantha Maga
Bangari (2013 film)
Banker Margayya
Bannada Gejje
Bannada Hejje
Bannada Vesha
Banni Ondsala Nodi
Bara
Baare Nanna Muddina Rani
Baaro Nanna Muddina Krishna
Bhavya Bharatha
Bayalu Daari
Bayalu Deepa
Bhayankara Bhasmasura
Bayasade Banda Bhagya
Bazaar Bheema
Bhajarangi
Bhajarangi 2
Beda Krishna Ranginata
Bedara Kannappa
Bedaru Bombe
Bedi
Bedi Bandavalu
Beedi Basavanna
Beegara Pandya
Beesida Bale
Bekkina Kannu
Beladingala Baale
Belli Belaku
Belli Kalungura
Belli Modagalu
Belli Naga
Belli Moda
Belliyappa Bangarappa
Beluvalada Madilalli
Benki
Benki Birugali (2013 film)
Benki chendu
Benkiya Bale
Benkiyalli Aralida Hoovu
Beralge Koral
Beretha Jeeva
Beru
Besuge
Bethala Gudda
Bete
Betegaara
Bettada Bhairava
Bettada Huli
Bettada Hoovu
Bettada Kalla
Bettada Thayi
Bethale Seve
Bevu Bella (1963)
Bevu Bella (1993)
Bhagyavantharu
Bhadrakali
Bhagvan Shree Saibaba
Bhagyachakra
Bhagyada Lakshmi Baramma
Bhagyadevathe
Bhagyada Baagilu
Bhagyajyothi
Bhagyavantha
Bhairava
Bhairavi
Bhakta Prahlada
Bhaktha Dhruva
Bhaktha Jnanadeva
Bhaktha Kumbara (1949)
Bhaktha Kumbara (1974)
Bhaktha Mallikarjuna
Bhaktha Markandeya
Bhaktha Prahlada
Bhaktha Ramadas
Bhaktha Siriyala
Bhaktha Vijaya
Bhakta Chetha
Bhaktha Prahlada
Bhale Adrushtavo Adrustha
Bhale Chatura
Bhama Sathyabhama
Bhanda Alla Bhadur
Bharatha Rathna
Bharath
Bharatha Nari 2000
Bharathi
Bharavase
Baari Bharjari Bete
Bharjari Gandu
Bhavaani
Bhagyodaya
Bhootayyana Maga Ayyu
Bhu Thayi Makkalu
Bhujangaiana Dashavatara
Bhukailasa
Bhulokadalli Yamaraja
Bhudana
Bhumi Thayane
Bhumi Thayiya Chochila Maga
Bhumige Banda Bhagavanta
Bhumigeetha
Bhupathi
Bhupathi Ranga
Bhuvana Jyothi
Bhuvaneshwari
Bidisada Banda
Bidugade
Bidugadeya Bedi
Bili Gulabi
Bili Hendthi
Biligiriya Banadalli
Bindaas
Bisi Bisi
Bisi Raktha
Bisilu Beladingalu
Black Market
Bombay Halva
Bombat Hendthi
Bombatt Huduga
Bombatt Raja Bandal Rani
Bombay Dada
Bombaat
Bombugalu sar bombugalu
Boregowda Bangalorige Banda
Boss
Brahmagantu
Bell Bottom
Brahmastra
Bramha Vishnu Maheshwara
Brindavana
Broker Bheeshmachari
Bruna
Budi Muchida kenda
Buddhivantha
Bhairava Geetha

C

C.B.I. Durga
C.B.I. Shankar
C.B.I. Shiva
C.B.I. Vijay
CID 72
CID Rajanna
Captain
Central Jail
Central Rowdi
Chaduranga (1969)
Chaduranga (1985)
Chadurida Chithragalu
Chaithrada Chiguru
Chaithrada Premanjali
Chakratheertha
Chakravarthy
Chakravyuha
Chalagara
Chalisada Sagara
Chalisuva Modagalu
Challenge
Challenge Gopalakrishna
Chamkayisi Chindiudaysi
Chamathkara
Chamundeshwari Mahime
Chanakya
Chanchala Kumari
Chanchala
Chandamarutha
Chandanada gombe
Chandavalliya Thota
Chandi Chamundi
Chandrahasa (1947)
Chandrahasa (1965)
Chandrakumara
Chandramuki Pranasakhi
Chandrodaya
Chanundeshwari Puja Mahime
Chapala Chennigaraya
Chappale
Chowkada Deepa
Chaya
Chellida Rakta
Cheluva
Cheluvina Chittara
Chennappa Channegowda
Chikka
Chikkamma
Chikkejamanru
Chinna
Chinna Nee Nagutiru
Chinna Ninna Muddaduve
Chinnada Gombe
Chinnadanta Maga
Chinnari Mutta
Chinnari Puttanna
Chingari (2012)
Chinthamani
Chira Bandavya
Chiranjeevi (1936 film)
Chiranjeevi (1976 film)
Chiranjeevi Sudhakara (1988)
Chiranjeevi Raje Gowda
Chithegu Chinte
Chithralekha
Chomana Dudi
Chora Chita Chora
Chora Guru Chandala Sishya
Chu Bana
Chukki Chandrama
Churi Chikkanna
Circle Inspector
Cowboy Kulla
College Hero
Crime
Chandana Chiguru
Chithrakuta-Kalyankumar (not released)
Chelvi
chigurida kanasu
Chandra Chakori
Cheluve Ondu Heltheeni
Cheluvina Chittara
Chanda

D

Darode
Dada
Daha
Daiva Leela
Daivashakti
Dakshayini
Dakota Express
Dakota picture
Dalalli
Dalavayi
Dampathiyaru
Dampatiyaru
Dance Raja Dance
Dange Edda Makkalu
Dara
Dharani Mandala Madhyadolage
Dari Tappida Maga
Darmapathni
Darmayudda
Dasara
Dashavathaara
Dava Dava
Dayadi
Daiva Sankalpa
December 31
Deepa
Deergha Sumangali
Deva
Deva Manava
Devadasi
Deva kannikaa
Devalaya
Devara Aata
Devara Duddu
Devara Gedda Manava
Devara Gudi
Devara Makkalu
Devara Mane
Devara Teerpu
Devara kannu
Devare Dikku
Devaru Kotta Tangi
Devaru Kotta Vara
Deva Sundari
Devata Manushya
Devate
Dhairya
Dhairya Lakshmi
Dhana Pishachi
Dhanalakshmi
Dhani
Dharma
Dharma Dari Tappitu
Dharma Pathni
Dharma Peeta
Dharma Vijaya
Dharmasere
Dharmatma
Dia
Digvijaya
Doddamane Estate
Dombara Krishna
Doni Saagali
Doomakethu
Doorada Betta
Dore
Dr. Krishna
Driver Hanumantu
Drona
Druvathaare
Drushya
Dudde Doddappa
Durga Puje
Durga Shakthi
Durgashtami
Duniya
Devara Maga
Dange (not released)
Dweepa
Dada Serada Doni (Shreedhar, Madhuri; not released)
Dharmasthala Mahathme
Dasha

E

Edakallu Guddada Mele
Eddide Gaddala
Edeyuru Siddalingeshwara Mahatme
Edurumane Meena
Ee Bandha Anubandha
Ee Hrudhaya Ninagagi
Ee Preethi Eke Bhumi Melide
Ee Jeeva Ninagagi
Ekalavya
Ella Hanakkagi
Ella Hengasarinda
Ellaranthalla Nanna Ganda
Ellellu Naane
Ellindalo Bandavaru
Elu Suttina Kote
Emergency
En Swamy Aliyandire
Endu Ninnavane
Ene Barali Preeti Irali
Entede Banta
Enundre
Eradu Hrudayagalu
Eradu Kanasu (1974 film)
Eradu Kanasu (2017 film)
Eradu Mukha
Eradu Nakshatragalu
Eradu Rekhegalu
Eshwar
Etu Ediretu
Edurmaneli Ganda Pakkadmaneli Hendthi
Eno Moha Eko Daha
Excuse me
Ee Sambashane

G

 Galige Gaali gopura Gaali maathu Gaalipata Ganda Berunda Ganda Hendathi Ganda Mane Makkalu Gandandre Gandu  Gandanige Thakka Hendathi Gandharva Gandharvagiri Gandharva Kanye Gandede Bhaira Gandhada Gudi Gandhada Gudi Part 2 Gandhi Nagara Gandondu Hennaru Gandu Guligalu Gandu Sidigundu Gandugali Gandugali kumararama Ganesha I Love You Ganesha Mahime Ganeshana Galaate Ganeshana Maduve Ganesha Subramanya Ganga Ganga Yamuna Gange Bare Tunge Bare Gange Gowri Garuda Garuda Rekhe Garuda Dhwaja Gayatri Maduve Gedda Maga Geddavalu Nane Geejagana Goodu Geetha Gejje Nada Gejje Puje Geluvina Saradara Geluvu Nannade Gharjane Gharshane Ghatashradhdha Giddu Dada Gili Bete Giri Bale Giri Kanye Giri Mallige God Father Gold Medal Golibar Golmal Part 2 Golmal Radhakrishna Gooli Googly Gopi Kalyana Govadalli CID 999 Government Gowramma Gowri Gowri Ganda Gowri Ganesha Gowri Kalyana Gowri Shankara Grahana Grihalakshmi (1969) Grihalakshmi (1992) Grihini Griha Pravesha Gudugu Sidilu Gulabi Talkies Guna Nodi Hennu Kodi Gunasagari Jathaka Rathna Gunda Joisa Goonda Mathu Police Goonda Rajya Goondaguru Gundana Madve Guri Guru (1989) Guru Jagadguru Guru Shishyaru (1981 film) Guru bhakti Guru-BramhaGaja
Ganda Hendathi & Boy Friend
Gopi
Gandugali Rama
Gangavva Ganagmayi-Ananth Nag (not released)
Gattimela
Gatti Thali Bitti Mela
Gajendra
Gajapathi Garvabhanga
Gaajina Mane
Gaalimathu
Govinda Gopala
Gunna
Guru Sarvabhowma Shree Raghavendra KaruneGaayaH

 Huliraaya Hatavaadi Hubli Hudugata Hagalu Vesha Haalu Jenu Halli Meshtru Hamsageethe Hanthakana Sanchu (1980)
 Haseena Haavina Hede 
 "Hebbuli"
 Hello Daddy Hrudaya Hadithu Huliya Haalina Mevu Hucha Huchana Maduveyalli Undavane Janna H2O Haalu Sakkare
Hudugatada Hudugi
Hudugigagi
Halli Haida
Halliya Surasuraru
Halliyadarenu Shiva
Hidambi Halli Pravesha
Hanthaka
Hanthakana Sanchu
Haavina Hejje
Haavada Hoovu
Haavu Eniyata
Hello Doctor (Sex)
Hello Narada
Hello Sister
Hello Yama
Hello
Hrudaya Sangama
Hrudaya Bandhana
Hrudaya Deepa
Hrudaya Pallavi
Hrudaya Raga
Hrudaya Hrudaya
Hrudaya Kallaru
Hrudayavantha
Hrudaya Geethe
Huliya (k.v.raju)
Huli Banthu Huli
Huli Hebbuli
Huliyada Kala
Hasida Hebbuli
Hasiru Thorana
Hasiru Gajina Bale (Sithara; not released)
Hoysala
Hathura Odeya
Honey Moon
Hunnimeya Rathriyalli
High Command
Hongkongnalli Agent Amar (Ambarish, Sumalatha)
Hongirana
Hosavarsha
Hosa Baduku (Ramakrishna, Ramkumar, Bhavya; not released)
Hosa Balu
Hubli
Hosa Jeevana
Hosa Love Story
Hosa Madam
Hosa Kavya
Hosa Belaku
Hosa Raga
Hosa Kalla Hale Kulla
Hosa Ithihasa
Hosa Neeru
Hosa Mane Aliya
Haalappa
Hoovondu Beku Ballige
Hoovu Mullu
Hoovu Hannu
Hoo Bisilu
Himapatha
Hubballi
Harish Jyoti Love Store (2011)

I

Indina Ramayana
Indrajith
Inspector Vikram
Inspector Jayasimha
Inspector Kranthikumar
Inspector Jhansy
Indrana gedda Narendra
Indra Dhanush
Indina Bharatha
Ide Maha Sudina
Iduve Jeevana
Idu Sadhya
Idu Entha Premavayya
Ivalentha Hendthi
Indra

J

 Jackie
 Jayasimha
 Jaana
 Jedara Bale
 Jeeboomba
 Jeevana Chaitra
 Jogi
 Jogayya
 Jootata
 Jokefalls
 Jaga Mecchida Maga
 Janumadha Jodi
 JodiHakki
 Jwalamukhi
 Jethendra
 Jenina Holle
 Junglee
 Januma Janumada Anubhanda
 Jaala
 Jodi
 Jamindaru (2002)
 Jugari
 Jeerjimbe
 Jagath Kiladi

KKantara (film) Kotigobba 2 K.G.F: Chapter 1 K.G.F: Chapter 2 * Kaaranji (2009)
 Kariya (2003)
 Kariya 2 (2016)
 Kallarali Hoovagi Kaadu Kaakana Kote Kaanuru Heggadathi Kadamba 
 Kampana prabhakar
 Kanneshwara Rama Kannu Theredu Nodu Kalaasipalya 
 Kalla Kulla 
 Kaaleju Ranga Kasturi Nivasa 
 Katpadi Junction Kavirathna Kalidasa Kiladi Jodi 
 "Kirik Party" 
 Kittu Puttu 
 Kulla Agent 000 
 Kallarali Hoovagi Kulavadhu 
 ku..ku... 
 Kallaraalihuvagi Karulinakare Karulina kugu 
 Kadahana Kavya Kaveri Kudremukha Kotigobba 
 Kotreshi Kanasu Krishna Kankambari Kula Gaurava (1971)
 Katheyondu Shuruvagide Kannadakkagi Ondannu OttiL

 Laali Laali Hadu Lagna Patrike Lankesh Patrike (film) Lifu estene Lion Jagapati Rao LOVE Love Guru Love Madi Nodu Love Training Lankesh Lift Kodla Law and Order Lock up Death Love Mocktail Love youLove you aliyalava kushaLaila majnuM

 Mussanje Maathu
 Manaroopa
 Mahaa Prachandaru
 Malaya Marutha
 Maleyali Jotheyali
 Mana Mechida Madaadhi
 Manasa Sarovara
 Mane Mane Kathe
 Mangala Muhurtha
 Mangalya Bhagya
 Masanada Makkalu (2005)
 Mareyada Haadu
 Masti
 Mathadana
 Mata
 Mayor Muthanna
 Miss California
 Mayura
 Milana
 Minchina Ota
 Minchina Ota
 Mojina Maduve
 Mooruvare Vajragalu
 Muddhina Maava
 Muthina Haara
 Muthu Ondhu Muthu
 My Autograph
 Mane Mane Ramayana
 Mungaru Male
 Mungaru Male 2
 Muniyana Maadari
 Munnudi
 My Dear Tiger
 Manamechida hudugi
 maavanige takka aliya
 Mruthyunjaya
 modada mareyalli
 Muthanna
 Maathaad Maathaadu Mallige
 Masth Maja Madi
 Mahakshatriya
 Maaleeyalli Joteyalli

N

 Nagamandala Naarada Vijaya Naagarahaavu Nagarahole Naa Ninna Bidalare Naa Ninna Mareyalare Naanu Nanna Hendthi Nanna kanasina hoove Nanna Preethiya Hudugi Nanobba Kalla Narada Vijaya Nayaka Ninagaagi Naanu Nagarahavu (Upendra) Naniruvudeninagagi Nannaseya Hoove Namma Samsara Nammoora Huduga Nammoora Mandara Hoove Namma Makkalu Nanna Rosha Nooru Varusha Naobba Kalla Naa Mechchida Huduga Ninagaagi Ninagoskara Nammoora Raja Nanjundi Kalyana Nanjunda Nakkaga Naguva Hoovu Nan Hendthi Maduve Nammoora Devathe Nagakanye Nagapooja Nagadevathe New Delhi Nodi Swamy Navirodu Hige Nyaya Ellide Nyayave Devaru Nage Habba Nenapirali Neelakantha Neenu Nakkare Haalu Sakkare Neelambari Nathicharami Nilukada Nakshatra Naduve AntaraviraliO

 Octopus (Kannada) Oda Huttidavaru Oda Huttidavalu Ohileshwara Olavu Mudidaaga Om Ondaanondu Kaaladalli Onde Balliya Hoogalu Ondu Muttina Kathe Operation Diamond Racket Operation Alamellama Operation Antha Ondagona Baa Oda Huttidavaru Onde Ondu Sari Ondu Oorina Kathe Ondu Premada Kathe Ondu Preethiya Kathe Ondu Cinema Kathe Om Namahshivaya Om Ganesh Omkara Onde Raktha Onde Guri Onde Rupa Eradu Guna Operation Jackpot CID 999 Orata I Love You Obbarigintha Obbaru Ondu SHaleya KatheP
 Pogaru Phaniyamma Paramatma Pujaari Puja Post master Prathidwani Praya Praya Praya PremaGrantha Premada Kanike Preethi Prema Pranaya Pushpaka Vimana (1987)
 Pushpaka Vimana (2016)
 Premaloka Putani Agent 123 prema Tharanga Paropakari Prana Premachari Paduvarahalli Pandavaru Parasangada Gendethimma Pujaphala Praja Prabhuthwa Prajashakthi PalitamshaR

 Ricky Raaj the Showman Raja Nanna Raja Raam Rahasya Ratri Rahasya Rakta Kanneeru Rana Ranga Ranganayaki Rashmi Ramachari Rama Lakshmana Rama Shama bhama Ranadheera Ranadheera Kanteerava Ravi Chandra Ravimama Rathnagiri Rahasya Rowdy Ranganna  Rayaru Bandaru Mavana Manege Rishi Road Romeo Romeo Rama Rama Re...RangitarangaRamboRambo2Raja NarasimhaRustumRupayi rajaRani MaharaniReadymade GandaRajaniRangannaRama KrishnaRasikaRavi ShastriRajakumariRanga (S.S.L.C)RannaRockyRajadhaniRing RoadRoseRajarathaRudra TandavaRocketRana VikramaRun AntonyS

 Sarkari Hi. Pra. Shaale, Kasaragodu, Koduge: Ramanna Rai Sakshatkara Samayadha Gombe Sampattige Saval Samskara Samyuktha Sanaadhi Appanna Sandhya Raga Satya Harishchandra  Savari  Schoolmaster Seetharamu Seetha Seizer Server Somanna Shankha nada Sharapanjara Shastri Sandeep Malani Sandesha SMS 6260 Shankar Guru Shubhamangala Sipayi Ramu Snehitara Saval Sose Thanda Sowbhagya Sri Krishnadevaraya Srimantana Magalu Subba Shasthri Sukha Samsarakke Hanneredu Suthragalu Sipaay Raamu Sirivantha Sixer Sogasugaara Shisya Simhada Mari Sainya Simhada Mari Simhadriya Simha Salinga kami Darshan Shabari Male Swami Ayappa Shruthi Swamy Suligaali  
 Suryakanthi Singapurinalli Raja Kulla Sipaayi Saarathi SnehitaruSchool BoySuperSuper RangaStabilitiSakathT

 Tagaru Tabarana Kathe Tarka Tarle nannamaga Thaayi Saheba (1997)
 Thaakath Thayige Thakkha MagaThe Villain (2018 film)Tiger padmini Tabbalyu Ninaade Magane Tirupathi Trimurthi Tuvvi Tuvvi Tuvvi Tutthuri Tananum Tananum Thavarige Baa ThangiThavarina siri (2006)
Thayiya Madilu (2007)
Tutta Mutta
Tuntata
Tunta
Tarak

U

 Upaasane Upendra (1999)
 Udupi Krishna Uyyaale Uppi Dada M.B.B.S. (2008)
 Usire 2001
 Ugaadhi Ullasa Utsaha (2009)
 ugramm (2014)
 Uppi 2 Udumba (2018) Ulidavaru Kandante UddishyaV

 Vajrakaya Vamshavruksha (1971)
 Vamshakobba Vasantha geetha Vasantha Lakshmi Vasantha Purnima Vasantha Kavya Vasantha Nilaya Vasantha Kala Varna Chakra Vamshi (2008)
 Veera Kannadiga (2004)
 Valmiki Veerappa nayaka Veera Parampare Varadhanayaka Veera Madakari Vaalee VictoryY

 Y2K (2004)
 Yaaradhu Yaardo Duddu Ellammana Jathre (2003)
 Yaare Nee Abhimani (2000)
 Yaare Neenu Cheluve (1998)
 Yaarige Saluthe Sambala (2000)
 Yaarivanu Yaaru (1996)
 Yahoo (2004)
 Yarivalu (2000)
 Yamakinkara (1995)
 Yamalokadalli Veerappan (1998)
 Yaara Sakshi? (1972)
 Yaarigu Helbedi (1994)
 Yaarivanu?  (1984)
 Yaaru hithavaru (1976)
 Yaaru Yaava huvu yara mudigo (1981)
 Yaava Janmada Maitri (1972)
 Yowanada Sulliyalli (1985)
 Yowvanada Holeyalli (1999)
 Yashwanth (2005)
 Yowanada Anubhava (1993)
 Youvana (2004)
 Yudha Mattu Swatantrya (2002)
 Yudhakanda (1989)
 Yuddha (1997)
 Yudhaparva (1991)
 Yuga Purusha (1989)
 Yuva Shakthi (1997)
 Yuvaraja (2001)
 Yuvarathnaa (2021)
 Yaksha (2010)
 Yodha (2009)
 Yajamana Yajamana (2019)

Z

 Z (1999)
 Zabardust (2005)
 Zamana (2010)
 Zindabad (1997)
 Zamindara'' (2000)

See also

 Kannada cinema
 Media in Karnataka
 List of Kannada-language children's films
 List of Kannada magazines
 List of Kannada newspapers
 List of Kannada radio stations
 List of Kannada television channels
 List of Indian films

 
Lists of Indian films
Lists of films by language